The Asian and Pacific Coconut Community (APCC or Cocommunity) is an intergovernmental organisation of states in Asia-Pacific that produce coconuts. The purpose of the APCC is "to promote, coordinate and harmonize all activities of the coconut industry".

In Bangkok on 12 December 1968, the Agreement establishing the Asian Coconut Community was concluded and signed by India, Indonesia, and the Philippines. After the treaty was ratified by these states, the Asian Coconut Community came into existence on 9 September 1969 with headquarters in Jakarta. When states outside Asia began to be admitted to the organisation, its name was changed to the "Asian and Pacific Coconut Community".

The member states of the APCC account for over 90 per cent of the world's coconut production and coconut exports. Member states of the APCC and the dates they joined are as follows (an asterisk indicates that the state has ratified the original 1968 Agreement):

Executive Directors
 Mr. G. P.Reyes (1969–85)
 Mr. P. G.Punchihewa (1985–2000)
 Mr. Norberto Boceta (2000–01)
 Dr. P. Rethinam (2002–05)
 Mr. Romulo N. Arancon, Jr. (2006–13)
 Mr. Uron N. Salum (2013–)

Notes

External links
Asian and Pacific Coconut Community: official website.
Ratifications of 1968 Agreement.

Coconut, Asian and Pacific Community
Organizations established in 1969
Organizations based in Jakarta
1968 in Thailand
Coconut production
Intergovernmental organizations established by treaty
Coconut organizations
Agricultural organizations based in Indonesia